The NCAA Women's Basketball All-American teams are teams made up of National Collegiate Athletic Association (NCAA) basketball players voted the best in the country by a variety of organizations.

History
All-America teams in women's college basketball were first selected upon the conclusion of the 1974–75 season by the Women's Basketball Coaches Association (WBCA). Through the 1981–82 season no divisional classifications existed – players from all collegiate teams were eligible for the honor. In 1982–83 the NCAA divided the All-America teams into University Division (present day Division I) and College Division (present day Division II and III). Since 1983–84, all three NCAA Divisions have been recognized with their own All-America teams.

Voting bodies used to determine selections
Through the years, the following media outlets have been recognized and have been used to determine All-America teams.

See also
 NCAA Men's Basketball All-Americans – NCAA Division I men's basketball equivalent

References

 
Awards established in 1975
History of college basketball in the United States